Sergio Silva may refer to:
Sergio Silva (Uruguayan footballer) (died 2000), Uruguayan footballer
Sérgio Silva (Portuguese footballer) (born 1994), Portuguese footballer
Sergio Silva (Italian producer) Italian television writer and producer